Christopher Jay Ritter (born October 20, 1990) is an American soccer player who last played for Chicago Fire of Major League Soccer.

Career

Youth & College
Ritter played five years of college soccer at Northwestern University between 2009 and 2013,red-shirting in 2010 after suffering a stress fracture in his leg early in the season. While at college, Ritter also appeared for USL PDL club Chicago Fire Premier between 2010 and 2013.

Professional
On January 13, 2014, Ritter signed with Chicago Fire as a Homegrown Player. On November 30, 2015 Chicago Fire declined his contract option.

References

External links 

1990 births
Living people
American soccer players
Association football midfielders
Chicago Fire FC players
Chicago Fire U-23 players
Homegrown Players (MLS)
Major League Soccer players
Northwestern Wildcats men's soccer players
People from Winnetka, Illinois
Soccer players from Illinois
Sportspeople from Cook County, Illinois
USL League Two players